The Ministry of Foreign Affairs (MFA; ;) is a ministry of the Government of Singapore responsible for conducting and managing diplomatic relations between Singapore and other countries and regions.

The Ministry of Foreign Affairs also provides consular assistance to Singaporeans travelling, working and studying overseas.

Organisational structure
The ministry now has 50 overseas missions including 7 high commissions, 21 embassies, 4 permanent missions to the United Nations, and 17 consulates. Singapore has appointed 31 honorary consuls-general/consuls abroad and has 46 non-resident ambassadors and high commissioners based in Singapore.

The ministry is currently divided into 11 directorates which deal with political and economic matters, and 7 directorates which oversee matters relating to protocol, consular issues and the Singapore Cooperation Programme (SCP) among others. 

The Corporate Affairs Directorate oversees organisational and resource management while the Human Resource Directorate and Diplomatic Academy manage the development of personnel and training.

Impact
Singapore has maintain diplomatic relations with 188 countries. In Singapore, there are 70 resident foreign embassies and high commissions, 43 foreign consulates and 11 international organisations based in Singapore. In addition, more than 60 non-resident foreign ambassadors are accredited to Singapore.

Ministers
The Ministry is headed by the Minister for Foreign Affairs, who is appointed as part of the Cabinet of Singapore. The incumbent minister is Vivian Balakrishnan from the People's Action Party.

See also
 List of current foreign ministers
 Foreign relations of Singapore
 List of diplomatic missions of Singapore

References

External links

 of the Ministry of Foreign Affairs

Foreign relations of Singapore
Foreign Affairs
Singapore
Ministries established in 1965
1965 establishments in Singapore